Leretia is a monotypic genus of flowering plants belonging to the family Icacinaceae. The only species is Leretia cordata 

Its native range is Costa Rica to southern Tropical America. It is also found in the countries of Bolivia, Brazil, Colombia, Costa Rica, Ecuador, French Guiana, Guyana, Panamá, Peru, Suriname and Venezuela.

The genus name of Leretia is in honour of Jean de Léry(1536–1613) was an explorer, writer and Reformed pastor born in Lamargelle, Côte-d'Or, France. The Latin specific epithet of cordata is derived from cordatus meaning heart-shaped or cordate.
Both genus and species were first described and published in Fl. Flumin. on page 99 in 1829.

References

Icacinaceae
Monotypic asterid genera
Plants described in 1829
Flora of Central America
Flora of northern South America
Flora of western South America
Flora of Brazil